Natalija Ambrazaitė (born 24 April 2001) is a Lithuanian female synchronized swimmer. She is the first Lithuanian to compete in World Championships.

Natalija Ambrazaitė competed at the 2019 World Aquatics Championships, where she became the first Lithuanian to ever compete at the World Championships. Ambrazaitė finished 24th in technical event and 27th in free routine.

References 

2001 births
Living people
Lithuanian synchronized swimmers
Artistic swimmers at the 2019 World Aquatics Championships